The Quinnipiac Bobcats baseball team (formerly the Quinnipiac Braves) is a varsity intercollegiate athletic team of Quinnipiac University in Hamden, Connecticut, United States. The team is a member of the Metro Atlantic Athletic Conference, which is part of the National Collegiate Athletic Association's Division I. The team plays its home games at Quinnipiac Baseball Field in Hamden, Connecticut. The Bobcats are coached by John Delaney.

Notable alumni
Turk Wendell is the only Quinnipiac baseball alumni to pitch in the major leagues. 22 players have been drafted by major league teams and 31 have played professionally. There are four alumni currently pitching in the minor leagues .

See also 
List of NCAA Division I baseball programs

References

External links